Alokito Bangladesh ( Alokito Bangladesh "Enlightened Bangladesh") is a daily newspaper in Bangladesh, published from Dhaka in the Bengali language. The newspaper was founded in 2013 and is today published in both print and online formats.

References 

Bengali-language newspapers published in Bangladesh
Newspapers published in Dhaka
Daily newspapers published in Bangladesh